Ancient Greek units of measurement varied according to location and epoch. Systems of ancient weights and measures evolved as needs changed; Solon and other lawgivers also reformed them en bloc. Some units of measurement were found to be convenient for trade within the Mediterranean region and these units became increasingly common to different city states. The calibration and use of measuring devices became more sophisticated. By about 500 BC, Athens had a central depository of official weights and measures, the Tholos, where merchants were required to test their measuring devices against official standards.

Length 

Area 

The ordinary units used for land measurement were:

Volume

Greeks measured volume according to either solids or liquids, suited respectively to measuring grain and wine. A common unit in both measures throughout historic Greece was the cotyle or cotyla whose absolute value varied from one place to another between 210 ml and 330 ml.

The Attic liquid measures were:

and the Attic dry measures of capacity were:

Currency 

The basic unit of Athenian currency was the obol, weighing approximately 0.72 grams of silver:

Mass
Mass is often associated with currency since units of currency involve prescribed amounts of a given metal. Thus for example the English pound has been both a unit of mass and a currency. Greek masses similarly bear a nominal resemblance to Greek currency yet the origin of the Greek standards of weights is often disputed. There were two dominant standards of weight in the eastern Mediterranean: a standard that originated in Euboea and that was subsequently introduced to Attica by Solon, and also a standard that originated in Aegina. The Attic/Euboean standard was supposedly based on the barley corn, of which there were supposedly twelve to one obol. However, weights that have been retrieved by historians and archeologists show considerable variations from theoretical standards. A table of standards derived from theory is as follows:
{| class="wikitable" style="margin: 1em auto 1em auto"
! Unit
! Greek name
! Equivalent
! Metric Equivalent
! Aeginetic standard
|-
| obol or obolus
|  
|
| 
| 
|-
| drachma
|  
| 6 obols
| 
| 
|-
| mina
|  
| 100 drachmae
| 
| 
|-
| talent
| 
| 60 minae
| 
| 
|}

Time 

Athenians measured the day by sundials and unit fractions. Periods during night or day were measured by a water clock (clepsydra) that dripped at a steady rate and other methods. Whereas the day in the Gregorian calendar commences after midnight, the Greek day began after sunset. Athenians named each year after the Archon Eponymous for that year, and in Hellenistic times years were reckoned in quadrennial epochs according to the Olympiad.

In archaic and early classical Greece, months followed the cycle of the Moon which made them not fit exactly into the length of the solar year. Thus, if not corrected, the same month would migrate slowly into different seasons of the year. The Athenian year was divided into 12 months, with one additional month (Poseidon deuterons, thirty days) being inserted between the sixth and seventh months every second year. Even with this intercalary month, the Athenian or Attic calendar was still fairly inaccurate and days had occasionally to be added by the Archon Basileus. The start of the year was at the summer solstice (previously it had been at the winter solstice) and months were named after Athenian religious festivals, 27 mentioned in the Hibah Papyrus, circa 275 BC.

See also
 Ancient Roman units of measurement
 Byzantine units of measurement
 Level staff

References

External links 
 
 
Online Conversion of Ancient Greek Units

 
Obsolete units of measurement
Human-based units of measurement